Ronald Trevor Drown, II (born c. 1970), is a master sergeant (E-8) in the 20th Special Forces Group (Airborne) and a businessman from Dover, Arkansas, who is a Republican member of the Arkansas House of Representatives for District 68 in Pope and Van Buren counties in the north central portion of his state. Drown ran in 2018 for election as Arkansas secretary of state.

Drown ran for election as Arkansas secretary of state in 2018 but was defeated by John Thurston in the Republican primary.

References

External links
 

1970 births
Living people
Arkansas Republicans
Arkansas Tech University alumni
Baptists from Arkansas
Businesspeople from Arkansas
Members of the Arkansas House of Representatives
People from Pope County, Arkansas
People from Russellville, Arkansas
United States Air Force officers
United States Army officers
21st-century American politicians
Arkansas Independents